Bolsterbjerg is a restaurant in near Årsballe, Bornholm, Denmark. It is noted for its botanical garden with a rich diversity of flora, established by Julius Hansen in 1882. In 1911, the old Bolsterbjerg was burned down and was later built at a new site, where Hansen also built a restaurant. Hansen died in 1930 and ceded the restaurant to his son, Sofus Hansen. As of 2012 the restaurant is run by Lola Mortensen and Dan Madsen.

References

External links
Official site

Restaurants in Denmark
Rønne
Buildings and structures in Bornholm
1882 establishments in Denmark